Hirsch Jacobs (April 8, 1904 – February 13, 1970) was an American thoroughbred horse trainer and owner.

Early life 
Jacobs grew up in East New York, Brooklyn in New York City. As a child he raised pigeons on the roof of his tenement building where he lived and raced them. He completed his formal schooling in elementary school at the age of 13; everything he knew about animal behavior and veterinary medicine was self-taught. An older friend, Charlie Ferraro, the brother of his boss, introduced Jacobs to horse racing when he took him to Jamaica Racetrack in Queens. Ferraro bought a horse for $1500 and asked Jacobs to train it.

Career 
As a youth Jacobs worked as a steamfitter's assistant, but he quit to become a "jack-of-all-trades" at the race track. On December 29, 1926 Jacobs had his first official winner, Reveillon, at Pompano, Florida. In 1927 he became a trainer with he who became his lifelong partner Isidor Izzy (Kid Beebee) Bieber. Bieber was a well-known gambler who was the inspiration for Damon Runyon's "Guys and Dolls." Bieber put up the money and Jacobs trained the horses.

Jacobs was the leading race-winning trainer in the United States 1933-39, 1941–44, the U.S. leading money-winning trainer, 1946, 1960, 1965, and the U.S. leading money-winning breeder, 1964-67. During his career, he saddled 3,569 winners, more than any other until the time of his death.

In 1958, Hirsch Jacobs was inducted into the National Museum of Racing and Hall of Fame.

Stymie 
Stymie was Jacobs biggest success. The horse was from the large King Ranch in Texas and was well-bred, but he was not winning until Jacobs bought him. In 1943 Jacobs purchased Stymie for $1,500 in a claiming race. By the end of Stymie's 7-year-long racing career which covered over 140 miles of racing, he had a lifetime earnings of $918,485, which was more than any other horse had earned until that time.  Those earnings helped Jacobs and Bieber establish a breeding farm in Maryland, Stymie Manor.

Family racing business 
Hirsch Jacobs and his wife Ethel owned a number of horses which were raced under her name. In 1970, the Jacobs family won two of the U.S. Triple Crown races, capturing the Preakness and Belmont Stakes. They won the Preakness with Personality, who earned American Horse of the Year honors, and the Belmont with High Echelon. Both horses were owned by Ethel Jacobs and trained by their son, John. Their daughter, Patrice, became involved in the sport. She married Louis Wolfson and their Harbor View Farm owned and bred the 1978 American Triple Crown champion, Affirmed.

Personal 
Hirsch Jacobs had a daughter, Patrice, and two sons, John and Tom. He had five brothers, Harry, Irving, Albert, Sidney, and Eugene, and four sisters, Mrs. Irene Robbins, Miss Helen Jacobs, Mrs. Florence Jacobson and Mrs. Lillian Gold. His brothers Sidney and Eugene both became trainers.

Hirsch Jacobs died in 1970 in Miami Beach, Florida of a cerebral hemorrhage. He was buried at Gate of Heaven Cemetery in Valhalla, New York.  He married Ethel Dushock in 1933. He had lived with his wife in Forest Hills, Queens.

References

Sources
 Hirsch Jacobs at the United States' ional Museum of Racing and Hall of Fame
 Bowen, Edward L. Masters of the Turf: Ten Trainers Who Dominated Horse Racing's Golden Age (2007) Eclipse Press
 June 26, 1961 Sports Illustrated feature story on the Jacobs family

1904 births
1970 deaths
American horse trainers
American Champion racehorse trainers
Jewish American sportspeople
American racehorse owners and breeders
United States Thoroughbred Racing Hall of Fame inductees
People from Forest Hills, Queens
Burials at Gate of Heaven Cemetery (Hawthorne, New York)
20th-century American Jews